5196 Bustelli is a stony Eunomia asteroid from the central regions of the asteroid belt, approximately  kilometers in diameter. It was discovered on 30 September 1973, by Dutch astronomers Ingrid and Cornelis van Houten at Leiden, and Tom Gehrels the Palomar Observatory. The S-type asteroid was named after Italian-Swiss artist Franz Anton Bustelli.

Orbit and classification 

Bustelli is a core member of the Eunomia family, a prominent family of stony S-type asteroid and the largest one in the intermediate main belt with more than 5,000 members. It orbits the Sun in the central asteroid belt at a distance of 2.3–3.1 AU once every 4 years and 5 months (1,619 days; semi-major axis of 2.7 AU). Its orbit has an eccentricity of 0.14 and an inclination of 13° with respect to the ecliptic. The body's observation arc begins with a precovery taken at Palomar Obsrvatory in March 1971.

Palomar–Leiden Trojan survey 

The survey designation "T-2" stands for the second Palomar–Leiden Trojan survey, named after the fruitful collaboration of the Palomar and Leiden Observatory in the 1960s and 1970s. Gehrels used Palomar's Samuel Oschin telescope (also known as the 48-inch Schmidt Telescope), and shipped the photographic plates to Ingrid and Cornelis van Houten at Leiden Observatory where astrometry was carried out. The trio is credited with the discovery of several thousand asteroid discoveries.

Naming 

This minor planet was named after Italian-Swiss artist Franz Anton Bustelli (1723–1763), a famous modeller of figures for the Nymphenburg Porcelain Manufactory. The official naming citation was published by the Minor Planet Center on 1 September 1993.

Physical characteristics 

Bustelli has an absolute magnitude of 12.8. In the SMASS classification, it is a stony S-type asteroid.

Diameter and albedo 

According to the survey carried out by the NEOWISE mission of NASA's Wide-field Infrared Survey Explorer, Bustelli measures 5.944 kilometers in diameter and its surface has an albedo of 0.146.

Rotation period 

As of 2018, no rotational lightcurve of Bustelli has been obtained from photometric observations. The body's rotation period, poles and shape remain unknown.

References

External links 
 Lightcurve Database Query (LCDB), at www.minorplanet.info
 Dictionary of Minor Planet Names, Google books
 Discovery Circumstances: Numbered Minor Planets (5001)-(10000) – Minor Planet Center
 
 

005196
Discoveries by Cornelis Johannes van Houten
Discoveries by Ingrid van Houten-Groeneveld
Discoveries by Tom Gehrels
3102
Named minor planets
005196
19730930